Vöslauer may refer to:

of or from Vöslau, a town in Austria
a synonym for the red wine grape Blauer Portugieser
Austria's first Sparkling wine
Vöslauer, a mineral water brand owned by Ottakringer